Thomas Nentwich (born 22 December 1975) is a retired Austrian football player and a football manager.

External links
 

1975 births
Living people
Austrian footballers
Austrian football managers
SKN St. Pölten managers
Association football defenders